Bara is a town located in Bara Tehsil in Khyber Khyber Pakhtunkhwa, Pakistan. Kohat is located to the south while Peshawar is located to the north of Bara.

Overview 
Bara is also the name of the local administrative division of Bara Tehsil in the Khyber Agency within the Khyber Pakhtunkhwa of Pakistan, of which Bara Town is the administrative seat. The Bara River flows through the town. The town has a fort built by British Raj and supplied water to Peshawar. The town is ethnically Pashtuns, and has been the site of increasing militancy by Lashkar-e-Islam against the central government.

Location 
The approximate location is 33° 55′ N latitude, 71° 27′ longitude. The mud fort is visible on Google Earth at 33° 54' 53" by 71° 28' 05", lying alongside a water tank and the Bara River which eventually flows to the East of Peshawar.

Notable people

Javed Afridi, Pakistani Business executive and entrepreneur best known as the CEO of Haier Pakistan.
Shahid Afridi, Pakistani international cricketer and the former captain of the Pakistan national cricket team.
Ayub Afridi (drug lord), Pakistani politician and drug smuggler.
Ayub Afridi (politician), Pakistani politician who has been a Member of the Senate of Pakistan since March 2018.
Shams Afridi, Finance Manager at Peshawar Zalmi & Haier Pakistan.
Zarif Khan, Pashtun American restaurant owner and investor.
[[Dr & Lieutenant Colonel Hikmat Afridi.
[[Iqbal Afridi, MNA 2018.

References

Populated places in Khyber District